Abd El Aziz Mohamed Hegazy (also known as Abdulaziz Hijazi) (3 January 1923 – 22 December 2014) was the 38th Prime Minister of Egypt during the presidency of Anwar Sadat.

Career
Hegazy received his PhD in commerce from the University of Birmingham in 1951. He was lecturer and later professor at the Cairo University and became Dean of the Faculty of Commerce at the Ain Shams University in 1966.

Hegazy served as Minister of the Treasury 1968 to 1972, and Minister of Finance and Foreign Trade 1973 to 1974. He was prime minister from 25 September 1974 to 16 April 1975. He was the head of the General Federation of Civil Society Groups.

References

External links

1923 births
2014 deaths
20th-century prime ministers of Egypt
Alumni of the University of Birmingham
Academic staff of Cairo University
Academic staff of Ain Shams University
Treasury ministers of Egypt
Finance Ministers of Egypt
Egyptian expatriates in the United Kingdom